General of the army, was the highest rank of the Indonesian Army. Within the Indonesian Armed Forces ranking system, it was the equivalent of admiral of the fleet and marshal of the air force. Those ranks were honorary and did not provide additional authority or responsibility.

The rank has been only awarded to three persons, all in 1997 on the 50th anniversary of the Indonesian National Armed Forces.

 Sudirman, also styled Grand Commander, the commander of the armed forces during the war of independence and a national hero. The rank was granted posthumously.
 Abdul Haris Nasution, a national hero, twice appointed chief of staff of the army, and a survivor of an assassination attempt in the 1965 coup attempt.
 Suharto, the second President of Indonesia. The rank was bestowed during his presidency.

As Government Regulation No. 32/1997 has been revoked and replaced by Government Regulation No. 39/2010, whereas the five-star rank is no longer exists in the new regulation. The rank may not be awarded anymore.

In January 2014, General Moeldoko, then serving as Commander of the National Armed Forces, briefly suggested awarding the rank to outgoing President Susilo Bambang Yudhoyono due to the latter's efforts in modernizing military. Former service members sitting in parliament firmly rejected the suggestion, citing the aforementioned regulation, and in any case, Yudhoyono himself, while appreciating Moeldoko's gesture, ultimately refused to take the award, with Minister of the State Secretariat Sudi Silalahi stating that the aforementioned efforts by Yudhoyono have since become a standard presidential duty.

See also
 General of the Army (United States)

References

Indonesia
Indonesian Army